Joel H. Spring (born September 24, 1940) is an American academic at the City University of New York who specializes in American and global educational policy. His major research interests are history of education, globalization and education, multicultural education, Native American culture, the politics of education, and human rights education. He received his Doctor of Philosophy degree in educational policy studies from the University of Wisconsin–Madison.

Selected works 

 Pedagogies of Globalization: The Rise of the Educational Security State, (2006) 
 How Educational Ideologies Are Shaping Global Society (2004) 
 Education and the Rise of the Global Economy (1998) 
 A Primer of Libertarian Education (1975)

Textbooks
 American Education (now in its 19th edition, 2020) 
 The American School: From the Puritans to the Trump Era (now in its 10th edition, 2018) 
 Conflict of Interests: The Politics of American Education (now in its 5th edition)

References 

Living people
1940 births
University of Wisconsin–Madison School of Education alumni
The New School faculty
People from San Diego
American historians of education